Gowhargan-e Sofla (also Romanized as Gowhargān-e Soflá; also known as Dālān-e Gowhargān and Gowhargān-e Pā’īn) is a village in Babuyi Rural District, Basht District, Basht County, Kohgiluyeh and Boyer-Ahmad Province, Iran. At the 2006 census, its population was 57, in 19 families.

References 

Populated places in Basht County